(born April 24, 1981) is a Japanese Gravure idol, actress, and talent. She was named as one of the "7 most irresistibly cute Japanese idols" by the Thailand version of FHM magazine in 2010. The magazine also dubbed her "the cutest villain ever" for her movie work in the "Hurricanger" series.

Works

Films
Ninpuu Sentai Hurricaneger Shushuuto The Movie (2002)-Furabijo
Ninpuu sentai Hurricaneger vs Gaoranger (2003)-Furabijo
Bakuryuu sentai Abaranger vs Hurricaneger (2004)-Furabijo
Tokusou Sentai Dekaranger The Movie: Full Blast Action (2004)-Student
GoGo Sentai Boukenger vs. Super Sentai(2007)-Furabijo
Ninpuu Sentai Hurricaneger: 10 Years After (2013)-Furabijo

Television series
"Ninpuu Sentai Hurricaneger" (2002-2003)-Furabijo
Detective Conan Case Closed episode 488. (She voiced Herself)

Album
 Azu★Tra~Urusei Yatsura Lum's Love Song~

See also
List of Japanese gravure idols
List of Japanese actresses
List of Japanese celebrities

References

External links
Tommy's Artist Company Official site, Profile

1981 births
Living people
Japanese gravure models
Japanese female models
Japanese television personalities
People from Funabashi
Rikkyo University alumni
Japanese actresses